Studio N may refer to:

 Studio N (company)
 Studio N (TV channel)